John Alexander McKesson III (1922 – May 21, 2002) was an American Career Foreign Service Officer who served as the American Ambassador Extraordinary and Plenipotentiary to Gabon (1970-1975). McKesson was also the Associate Editor of Arts d'Afrique Noire and an adjunct Professor of politics at the Institute of French Studies at New York University.

Biography
McKesson entered Columbia University as a junior and went on to receive an AB and MA.  After serving four years in the navy during World War II and working for a short time at Goodyear Tire and Rubber Company in Akron, Ohio, he joined the Foreign Service in 1947.

References

1922 births
2002 deaths
Ambassadors of the United States to Gabon
Columbia University alumni
New York University faculty
American editors
United States Navy personnel of World War II